Narestø is a village in Arendal municipality in Agder county, Norway. The village is located on the southern shore of the island of Flostaøya, just south of the historic Flosta Church.

References

Villages in Agder
Arendal